

The Main Administration for Affairs of Prisoners of War and Internees was an NKVD (later MVD) department in charge of handling of foreign civilian internees and prisoners of war (POWs) in the Soviet Union during and in the aftermath of World War II (1939–1953).

GUPVI was established as a part of the NKVD under the name "Administration for Affairs of Prisoners of War and Internees (UPVI) in September 1939, after the Soviet invasion of Poland. The qualifier "main" was added in January 1945.

The legal foundation for its creation was the Sovnarkom Decree of July 1, 1941 "Regulations on Prisoners of War" ("Положение о военнопленных"), updated by the September 29, 1945 "Regulations on Use of Labor of Prisoners of War" (Положение о трудовом использовании военнопленных).

In many ways, the GUPVI system was similar to GULAG. Its major function was the organization of foreign forced labor in the Soviet Union. Top GUPVI leadership came from the GULAG system. Conditions in the two camp systems were similar: hard labor, poor nutrition and living conditions, high mortality rates.

One major difference with the GULAG system was the absence of convicted criminals in GUPVI camps. Another was that GUPVI camps provided a major source of recruitment of future communist activists for communist states such as the German Democratic Republic and the Polish People's Republic, as well as for various "democratic committees" made up of nationals such as Japanese and Austrians. Significant efforts were made to "ideologically reforge" (идеологическая перековка) prisoners, and numerous clubs, libraries and local radio stations were created.

During the GUPVI's fourteen-year existence, it administered over 500 POW camps in the Soviet Union and abroad, housing over four million prisoners.

Chiefs
1939-1943: Pyotr Soprunenko, major of state security
1943-1945: I.A. Petrov, lieutenant general
1945-1947: Mikhail Krivenko (Krivenko Mikhail Spiridonovich, 1904–1954)
1947-1949: Taras Filippov, lieutenant general
1949-1950: I.A. Petrov, lieutenant general (deputy chief, until his discharge for health reasons on November 21, 1950)
1950-1953: Amayak Kobulov, lieutenant general (1950-1951: NKVD GUPVI, 1951-1953: MVD UPVI)

See also
List of POW camps in the Soviet Union
Katyn massacre

Notes

References

Bibliography

Sharkov, Anatoli, GUPVI Archipelago: Prisoners of War and Internees on the Territory of Belarus: 1944--1951(in Russian) (2003), Minsk, Belarus,  (Online excerpt) 
Maksim Zagorulko (ed.) (2005) "Regional Structures of the USSR NKVD/MVD GUPVI, 1941-1951: Reporting and Informational Documents" (Regionalnye Struktury GUPVI NKVD-MVD SSSR, 1941-1951 : Otchetno-Informatsionnye Dokumenty; Региональные структуры ГУПВИ НКВД - МВД СССР. 1941 - 1951: Военнопленные в СССР. 1939 - 1956: Документы и материалы. Отчетно-информационные документы. Т. 5: Кн. 2)  

NKVD
Military history of the Soviet Union during World War II
World War II prisoners of war held by the Soviet Union
Unfree labor during World War II
Unfree labor in the Soviet Union